A pressure ridge, when consisting of ice, is a linear pile-up of sea ice fragments formed in pack ice by accumulation in the convergence between floes.

Such a pressure ridge develops in an ice cover as a result of a stress regime established within the plane of the ice. Within sea ice expanses, pressure ridges originate from the interaction between floes, as they collide with each other. Currents and winds are the main driving forces, but the latter are particularly effective when they have a predominant direction. Pressure ridges are made up of angular ice blocks of various sizes that pile up on the floes. The part of the ridge that is above the water surface is known as the sail; that below it as the keel. Pressure ridges are the thickest sea ice features and account for about one-half of the total sea ice volume. Stamukhi are pressure ridges that are grounded and that result from the interaction between fast ice and the drifting pack ice.

Internal structure 

The blocks making up pressure ridges are mostly from the thinner ice floe involved in the interaction, but it can also include pieces from the other floe if it is not too thick. In the summer, the ridge can undergo a significant amount of weathering, which turns it into a smooth hill. During this process, the ice loses its salinity (as a result of brine drainage). This is known as an aged ridge. A consolidated ridge is one whose base has undergone complete freezing. The term consolidated layer is used to designate freezing up of the rubble just below the water line. The existence of a consolidated layer depends on air temperature — in this layer, the water between individual blocks is frozen, with a resulting reduction in porosity and an increase in mechanical strength. A keel's depth of an ice ridge is much higher than its sail's height - typically about four times. The keel is also 2-3 times wider than the sail.

Thickness 
The total thickness for a multiyear ridge was reported to be .

Characterization methods 
The physical characterization of pressure ridges can be done using the following methods:
 Mechanical drilling of the ice, whereby augers designed for ice are driven through the ridge, and the core retrieved for analysis.
 Surveying, whereby a level, theodolite or a differential GPS system is used to determine sail geometry.
 Thermal drilling – drilling involving melting of the ice.
 Observation of the ice canopy by scuba divers.
 Upward looking sonars.   
 A series of thermistors, to monitor temperature changes.
 Electromagnetic induction, from the ice surface or from an aircraft.

Interest for pressure ridges 
From an offshore engineering and naval perspective, there are three reasons why pressure ridges are a subject of investigation. Firstly, because the highest loads applied on offshore structures operating in cold oceans by drift ice are associated with these features. Secondly, when pressure ridges drift into shallower areas, their keel may come into contact with the seabed, thereby representing a risk for subsea pipelines (see Seabed gouging by ice) and other seabed installations. Thirdly, they have a significant impact on navigation. In the Arctic, ridged ice makes up about 40% of the overall mass of sea ice.

See also 

 Finger rafting
 Iceberg
 Ice volcano
 Offshore geotechnical engineering

Notes

References

Geomorphology
Landforms
Glaciology
Sea ice
Snow or ice weather phenomena